Released in 2005, Folkways:  The Original Vision (Woody and LeadBelly) is an expanded rerelease of the 1989 album Folkways: The Original Vision, created by Smithsonian Folkways to document the origins of the Folkways Records label.  The rerelease was created on the 15th anniversary of the original album, and included enhanced liner notes and six bonus tracks.

The recordings of Woody Guthrie and Lead Belly are showcased and complemented with a 28-page illustrated booklet, providing insight on the history and mission of Folkways Records.

Track listing
Vigilante Man
Gallis Pole
This Land Is Your Land
Talking Hard Work
Midnight Special
In the Pines
Pastures of Plenty
Car Song
We Shall Be Free
Bring Me a Little Water, Sylvie
Pretty Boy Floyd
Do-Re-Mi
I Ain't Got No Home in This World Anymore
Jesus Christ
Cotton Fields
Rock Island Line
Grand Coulee Dam
4, 5, and 9
Will Geer Reading Woody Guthrie
Hard Traveling
Fannin Street
Philadelphia Lawyer
Hobo's Lullaby
Bourgeois Blues
Gray Goose
Irene

References

2005 albums
Woody Guthrie albums
Folkways Records albums
Lead Belly albums